The Treaty of Amritsar, executed by the British East India Company and Raja Gulab Singh of Jammu after the First Anglo-Sikh War, established the princely state of Jammu and Kashmir under the suzerainty of the British Indian Empire.

Description 
The treaty was executed on 16 March 1846. It formalised the arrangements in the Treaty of Lahore between the British East India Company and Raja Gulab Singh of Jammu after the First Anglo-Sikh War. By Article 1 of the treaty, Gulab Singh acquired "all the hilly or mountainous country with its dependencies situated to the eastward of the River Indus and the westward of the River Ravi including Chamba and excluding Lahul, being part of the territories ceded to the British Government by the Lahore State according to the provisions of Article IV of the Treaty of Lahore, dated 9th March, 1846." Under Article 3, Gulab Singh was to pay 75 lakhs (7.5 million) of Nanak Shahi rupees (the ruling currency of the Sikh Empire) to the British Government, along with other annual tributes. The Treaty of Amritsar marked the beginning of Dogra rule in Kashmir.

During First Anglo-Sikh War, Maharaja Gulab Singh Jamwal (Dogra) helped the British Empire against the Sikhs. After the defeat of the Sikh Empire The Treaty of Lahore (9 March 1846) and the Treaty of Amritsar (1846) (16 March 1846) were signed. As part of the Treaty of Lahore, signed between the 7 year old Maharaja Duleep Singh (Sikh) (4 September 1838 – 22 October 1893) and the 
British Empire on (9 March 1846), Jammu was taken over by the British Empire on paper. 
Article 12 of the Treaty of Lahore stated:
"In consideration of the services rendered by Rajah Golab Sing of Jummoo, to the Lahore State, towards procuring the restoration of the relations of amity between the Lahore and British Governments, the Maharajah hereby agrees to recognize the Independent sovereignty of Rajah Golab Sing in such territories and districts in the hills as may be made over to the said Rajah Golab Sing, by separate Agreement between himself and the British Government, with the dependencies thereof, which may have been in the Rajah's possession since the time of the late Maharajah Khurruck Sing, and the British Government, in consideration of the good conduct of Rajah Golab Sing, also agrees to recognize his independence in such territories, and to admit him to the privileges of a separate Treaty with the British Government."

Then as part of the Treaty of Amritsar (1846) Maharaja Gulab Singh Jamwal agreed to serve the British Empire under Article 6:  "Maharajah Gulab Singh engages for himself and heirs to join, with the whole of his Military Forces, the British troops when employed within the hills or in the territories adjoining his possessions." and in exchange under Article 9 "The British Government will give its aid to Maharajah Gulab Singh in protecting his territories from external enemies." After which the Dogras served the British Empire in the Indian Rebellion and in the various wars. Hence a large percentage of the Kashmiris fought in the First World War and in the Second World Wars, as part of the Jammu and Kashmir State Forces and directly with the Royal Navy, The British Army, the merchant navy and Gilgit Scouts as mentioned by Major William A. Brown in his book The Gilgit Rebellion 1947.

Hence 1.1 million Kasmiris now live in the UK. The high taxes to support these wars were resented by all the Kashmiris including the Hindus, Muslims and the Sikhs And combined with the tens of thousands of trained men, coming back from the Second World War generated a highly volatile situation in 1947.

Lacking the resources to occupy such a large region immediately after annexing portions of Punjab, the British got Gulab Singh pay 75 thousand Nanakshahee Rupees for the war-indemnity. The angry courtiers of Lahore (particularly the baptized Sikh, Lal Singh) then incited the governor of Kashmir to rebel against Gulab Singh, but this rebellion was defeated, thanks in great part to the action of Herbert Edwardes, Assistant Resident at Lahore. The Kashmiris also rebelled throughout Jammu and Kashmir.

To pay for this, from the very start the Kashmiris were heavily taxed and complained of being sold into slavery and extensive literature was written by the British writers regarding these treaties. The Slavery Abolition Act 1833 (3 & 4 Will. IV c. 73) abolished slavery throughout the British Empire. The Slavery Abolition Act 1833 (3 & 4 Will. IV c. 73) came into force before the Treaty of Amritsar (1846) was signed (16 March 1846). As far back as 1868 in the book Cashmere Misgovernment, Robert Thorp stated that the people of Kashmir were sold into slavery to Gulab Singh. Arthur Brinkman in his paper "The Wrongs of Cashmere" written in December 1867, also states he: "informs the reader of the wretched condition of a people we sold against their inclination, and their united cry to us." Arthur Brinkman was an Anglican Missionary and the Anglican Missionary Groups had worked with the Anti Slavery Society to push for The Slavery Abolition Act 1833 a few years earlier

Text of the treaty 
Following is the detailed treaty of Amritsar:

See also
List of treaties
Treaty of Lahore

References

External links

Treaties of the British East India Company
Indian documents
1846 in India
1846 treaties
Amritsar
Jammu and Kashmir (princely state)
Amritsar
March 1846 events